The following is a list of notable events and releases of the year 1912 in Norwegian music.

Events

Deaths

 December
 28 – Ola Mosafinn, hardingfele fiddler and composer (born 1828).

Births

 January
 1 – Svein Øvergaard, jazz saxophonist and percussionist (died 1986).

 May
 19 – Jens Gunderssen, singer, songwriter, actor, stage producer, and theatre director (died  1969).

 June
 6 – Robert Levin, classical pianist and composer (died 1996).

 November
 26 – Gunnar Sønstevold, composer and pianist (died 1991).

 December
 12 – Thorbjørn Egner, actress, children's writer, songwriter, playwright and illustrator (died 1990).

See also
 1912 in Norway
 Music of Norway

References

 
Norwegian music
Norwegian
Music
1910s in Norwegian music